Ernest Brian Toews (December 16, 1941 – January 27, 2019) was a Canadian curler. He won the  playing third on the Mike Riley rink, and won a silver medal at the 1998 Canadian Senior Curling Championships. After playing in the 1986 Labatt Brier, he retired from competitive curling due to a bad knee.

Personal life
Toews was born in Altona, Manitoba and grew up on a family family farm. He played baseball in his youth, playing for the Plum Coulee Pirates in the Southeastern Manitoba League. In 1961 he moved to Winnipeg. At the time of the 1984 Brier, he was an accountant for James B Carter Ltd. He was married and had one son.

Teams

References

External links 

 Brian Toews – Curling Canada Stats Archive
 "Riley Appreciates Rest, Wendorf" - The Phoenix, April 7, 1984
 "Riley Finally Emerges" - The Leader Post, March 12, 1984 (section B, page B1)

1941 births

2019 deaths
Canadian male curlers
Brier champions
People from Pembina Valley Region, Manitoba
Curlers from Winnipeg
Canadian baseball players